Priekuļi Parish is an administrative unit of Cēsis Municipality in the Vidzeme region of Latvia.

Towns, villages and settlements of Priekuļi Parish

References 

Parishes of Latvia
Cēsis Municipality
Vidzeme